Justine Florence Saunders,  (20 February 1953 – 15 April 2007) was an Australian stage, television and film actress.  She was a member of the Woppaburra, an Australian Aboriginal people, from the Kanomie clan of Great Keppel Island in Queensland. On the small screen she appeared in numerous series, mini-series and telemovies.

Screen roles
Saunders having started her career in theatre, made her screen debut in the television serial Rush in 1974, but first came to prominence as a cast member of soap opera Number 96 in 1976, as Rhonda Jackson. a character defending the rights of indigenous Australians. Subsequently, in 1986 she became best known for her role as social worker Pamela Madigan in the serial Prisoner

Other television credits include: Skyways, Women of the Sun (1981), Farscape, Blue Heelers, and MDA.

Her film work includes The Chant of Jimmie Blacksmith and The Fringe Dwellers.

Order of Australia Medal
In 1991, Saunders was awarded a Medal of the Order of Australia (OAM), for her services to the performing arts, her services to the National Aboriginal Theatre, and for her assistance in setting up the Black Theatre and the Aboriginal National Theatre Trust.

In 2000, through the indigenous Senator Aden Ridgeway, she returned the medal in protest at the emotional turmoil her mother was suffering over the Howard government's denial of the term "stolen generation".

Personal
Saunders was born next to a railway track. At the age of 11, as a member of the Stolen Generation, she was removed from her mother Heather and taken to Brisbane and placed in a convent. Heather was not told of Justine's whereabouts for more than ten years, and spent much of that time searching for her.

In April 2007, Saunders died of cancer at Hawkesbury District Hospital, Sydney, aged 54.

Honours and awards
1985 Saunders received the inaugural Aboriginal Artist of the Year award.
1991  Medal of the Order of Australia
1999 Red Ochre Award - Australia Council for the Arts

Filmography

References

External links
 

1953 births
2007 deaths
20th-century Australian actresses
21st-century Australian actresses
Australian film actresses
Australian soap opera actresses
Australian stage actresses
Deaths from cancer in New South Wales
Indigenous Australian actresses
Members of the Stolen Generations
People from Queensland
Actresses from Sydney
Recipients of the Medal of the Order of Australia